The Pacific parakeet or Nicaraguan green conure (Psittacara strenuus) is a species of parakeet. Some ornithologists consider it a subspecies of the green parakeet (Psittacara holochlorus), however it is considered a full species according to the IOC World Bird List.

References

Pacific parakeet
Pacific parakeet
Birds of Nicaragua
Pacific parakeet
Taxa named by Robert Ridgway